Alwin v. State Farm Fire and Casualty Co., 610 N.W.2d 218 (Wis. Ct. App. 2000), was a case decided by the Wisconsin Court of Appeals that provided an exception to the statutory strict liability of dog owners for injuries caused by their dogs.

Decision
The plaintiff (the defendant's mother) tripped over the defendant's dog and sustained injuries. The Wisconsin civil code §174.02 holds dog owners strictly liable for all injuries caused by their dogs, and this theoretically allowed recovery in this case. The court, however, ruled that as a matter of public policy the defendant should not be held liable for someone tripping over their dog.

Subsequent history
Review was denied by the Wisconsin Supreme Court on May 23, 2000.<ref>Alwin v. State Farm Fire and Casualty Co., 237 Wis.2d 253 (2000)</ref>

ImpactAlwin'' has been cited as an example of case-by-case consideration of tort claims that avoids inequitable results that might follow the blind application of strict formulations of liability.

References

External links
Text of opinion from the Wisconsin State Bar

United States tort case law
2000 in United States case law
Wisconsin state case law
State Farm
2000 in Wisconsin
Dogs in the United States
United States lawsuits